Michael Lorri Scioscia (born November 27, 1958), nicknamed "Sosh" and "El Jefe", is an American former Major League Baseball catcher and manager in Major League Baseball (MLB). He managed the Anaheim / Los Angeles Angels of Anaheim / Los Angeles Angels from the 2000 season through the 2018 season, and was the longest-tenured manager in Major League Baseball and second-longest-tenured coach/manager in the "Big Four" (MLB, NFL, NHL, and NBA), behind only Gregg Popovich at the time of his retirement. He was selected to two All-Star Games and won two World Series over the course of his 13-year MLB career, which was spent entirely with the Dodgers; this made him the only person in MLB history to spend his entire playing career with one team and entire managing career with another team with 10+ years in both places. He was signed by the San Diego Padres and Texas Rangers late in his career, but never appeared in a major league game for either team due to injury.

After his playing career ended, Scioscia spent several seasons as a minor league manager and major league coach in the Dodgers organization before being hired as the Angels manager after the 1999 season. He is the Angels' all-time managerial leader in wins, games managed, and division titles. On May 8, 2011, Scioscia became the 56th manager to win 1,000 or more games, and the 23rd to have all 1,000 or more victories with a single team.

Professional career

Draft and minor leagues
Scioscia was drafted by the Los Angeles Dodgers in the 1st round (19th overall pick) of the 1976 amateur draft.

Los Angeles Dodgers (1980–1992)
He debuted for the Dodgers in 1980 (replacing Steve Yeager) and went on to play 12 years for the team. Dodger manager Tommy Lasorda helped lobby Scioscia to sign with the Dodgers after the team drafted him out of Springfield (Delaware County) High School, a public school located in the suburbs of Philadelphia in 1976. 

Scioscia made himself invaluable to the Dodgers by making the effort to learn Spanish in order to better communicate with rookie sensation Fernando Valenzuela in 1981. 

Scioscia went to the San Diego Padres in 1993, but suffered a torn rotator cuff injury during spring training that year and did not play in any regular season games for the team.  He closed out his career with the Texas Rangers in 1994 after a failed attempt to come back from the injury, again without having played in any regular season games that year.

Exclusively a catcher, the 6-foot, 2-inch, 230 pound Scioscia was primarily known for his defense. Former Dodgers vice president Al Campanis once called Scioscia the best plate-blocking catcher he had seen in his 46-year baseball career. In one collision with St. Louis Cardinals' slugger Jack Clark in July 1985, Scioscia was knocked unconscious but still held onto the ball.  Scioscia, however, has claimed he had an even harder plate collision the following season.

Scioscia's technique for blocking the plate and making a tag varied slightly from the traditional manner employed by most catchers.  When applying the tag, most catchers hold the baseball in their bare hand, with that hand then being inside their catcher's mitt to apply the tag with both hands. Scioscia preferred to hold the ball in his catcher's mitt without making use of his bare hand.  Also, Scioscia felt he was less prone to injury in a collision if positioned his body so that he was kneeling on both knees and turned to the side, whereas most catchers make their tag either standing or on one knee. 

Indeed, Scioscia was noted for his durability.  After missing most of the 1983 season after tearing his rotator cuff, Scioscia played in more than 100 games each season for the remainder of his career with the Dodgers. Offensively, Scioscia was generally unspectacular, but he was known as a solid contact hitter, striking out fewer than once every 14 at-bats over the course of his career. Because of his ability to make contact, he was sometimes used as the second hitter in the batting order—an atypical slot for a player with Scioscia's large-set frame and overall batting average.  He had a particularly strong season on offense in 1985, batting .296 and finishing second in the National League in on-base percentage.

Scioscia also hit a dramatic, ninth inning, game-tying home run off the New York Mets' Dwight Gooden in Game 4 of the 1988 National League Championship Series. With the Dodgers going on to win that game in extra innings, Scioscia's blast (which came after he had hit only three home runs that entire season) proved crucial to the Dodgers' ultimately prevailing in that series.

Scioscia was a key player on the Dodgers' 1981 and 1988 World Series champion teams, and is the Dodgers' all-time leader in games caught (1,395). In 1990, Scioscia became the first Dodger catcher to start in an All-Star Game since Hall of Famer Roy Campanella. Alfredo Griffin, Scioscia's teammate from the 1988 Dodger team, served on Scioscia's coaching staff with the Los Angeles Angels of Anaheim from 2000-2018. Scioscia earned as much as $2,183,333/year in salary toward the end of his career, and earned the unofficial total sum of $10,109,999 over his career.

Scioscia was involved in three no-hitters in his career: he was on the losing end of Nolan Ryan's 5th no-no on September 26, 1981 vs. the Houston Astros, and on the winning side, he caught Fernando Valenzuela's on June 29, 1990 vs. the St. Louis Cardinals and Kevin Gross's on August 17, 1992 vs. the San Francisco Giants. He caught 136 shutouts during his career, ranking him fourth all-time among major league catchers. Scioscia used the same catcher's mitt for most of his playing career.

Career statistics

Managerial career

Anaheim Angels / Los Angeles Angels of Anaheim / Los Angeles Angels (2000–2018)
After spending several years as a coach in the Dodgers' organization, Scioscia was hired by new Angels general manager Bill Stoneman to be the Angels' manager after the 1999 season, following the late-season resignation of Terry Collins and interim managerial tenure of Joe Maddon.

Under the leadership of Stoneman and Scioscia, the Angels ended their 16-year playoff drought in 2002, winning the AL Wild Card and ultimately winning the franchise's first World Series, a series that pitted the Angels against a San Francisco Giants team managed by Scioscia's former Dodgers teammate Dusty Baker. In winning the series, Scioscia became the 17th person to win a World Series as both a player and a manager (not including those who won as a player-manager).

Scioscia was honored as 2002 American League Manager of Year by the Baseball Writers' Association of America (the official Manager of the Year award, as recognized by Major League Baseball).  He was also named 2002 A.L. Manager of the Year by The Sporting News, USA Today Sports Weekly, and the Negro Leagues Baseball Museum.  He was further named the overall Major League 2002 Manager of the Year by Baseball America.

The Angels under Scioscia would go on to enjoy a period of on-field success never before seen in franchise history, winning five American League West division titles in six years (surpassing the number won by all previous Angels managers combined). Scioscia's Angels broke the franchise single-season win record with 99 wins in 2002, and again with 100 wins in 2008. However, they have yet to win another American League pennant or World Series since their memorable 2002 run.

He was also the longest tenured manager in Major League Baseball. In January 2009, he received a multi-year extension on his contract; his former contract ran through the 2010 season. The number of additional years created through this contract was 10 years, through 2018. Scioscia was honored as 2009 American League Major League Manager of Year by the Baseball Writers' Association of America (the official Manager of the Year award, as recognized by Major League Baseball).

Scioscia became the first manager to reach the playoffs in six of his first ten seasons. On May 8, 2011, the Angels defeated the Cleveland Indians, which marked Scioscia's 1,000th win as a major league manager.

A rift developed between Scioscia and Jerry Dipoto, the Angels' general manager, when Dipoto fired Mickey Hatcher from the role of the team's hitting coach in 2012. Despite rumors that the Angels might replace either Dipoto or Scioscia after the 2013 season, Moreno announced that both would return to the Angels for the 2014 season.

Tension between Dipoto and Scioscia continued during the 2015 season regarding the way Scioscia and his coaches delivered statistical reports developed by Dipoto and the front office to their players. Dipoto resigned his post on July 1, 2015, despite efforts from the Angels to convince him to stay. Former Angels general manager Bill Stoneman, who hired Scioscia before the 2000 season, was hired as the interim GM.

After 19 seasons as manager, following the conclusion of the 2018 season, Scioscia announced that he would step down as manager of the Angels on September 30, 2018. He finished with a record of 1650 wins and 1428 losses.

United States national team

On April 6, 2021, USA Baseball announced that Scioscia would manage the United States national baseball team during qualifying for baseball at the 2020 Summer Olympics, held in Tokyo in 2021. The team subsequently qualified, with Scioscia serving as manager for the Olympics. The team went on to win silver, falling to Japan in the gold-medal game.

Managerial record

Television appearances

In addition to his more orthodox work in baseball, Scioscia is also notable for a guest appearance as himself on The Simpsons episode "Homer at the Bat" in 1992, while he was still a player. In the storyline, Scioscia is one of several Major League players recruited by Smithers to work a token job at the Springfield Nuclear Power Plant so that he could play on the plant's softball team against a rival power plant. Scioscia tells Smithers, who found him while deer hunting, that while he enjoyed playing baseball, he always wanted to be a blue collar power plant employee, and consequently is the only player who takes the power plant job seriously. His character is ultimately hospitalized with a life-threatening case of radiation poisoning that leaves him unable to play.

They called and asked if I'd be interested in doing it, and it so happened that it was my favorite show.  I was excited . . . Every year I get a (residual) check for like $4 . . . I cash 'em. I don't want to mess up their accounting department.
— Mike Scioscia, about his appearance on The Simpsons

Scioscia made a second appearance on The Simpsons with the episode "MoneyBart", which premiered on October 10, 2010. Having survived the radiation poisoning, he tells Marge and Bart that it gave him superhuman managing powers and that the best players listen to their managers.

Scioscia acted as a celebrity endorser of the Howard's Appliance & Big Screen Superstore chain in Southern California.

Personal life

Early in his career after signing with the Dodgers, Scioscia spent the off-seasons attending Penn State University, working toward a computer science degree.
Scioscia and his wife Anne have two children and reside in Westlake Village, California.

Their son Matthew, who played baseball for Notre Dame, was selected in the 45th round by the Angels in the 2011 MLB Draft. He signed on June 20, and was assigned to the AZL Angels. He was traded to the Chicago Cubs for Trevor Gretzky, son of Wayne Gretzky, on March 20, 2014. He was released by the Windy City ThunderBolts on June 14.

See also

 List of Major League Baseball All-Star Game managers
 List of Major League Baseball career putouts as a catcher leaders
 List of Major League Baseball players who spent their entire career with one franchise
 List of Major League Baseball managers by wins

References

External links

ESPN Profile

1958 births
Living people
Albuquerque Dukes players
Baseball coaches from Pennsylvania
American people of Italian descent
Anaheim Angels managers
Baseball players from Pennsylvania
Bellingham Dodgers players
Charlotte Rangers players
Clinton Dodgers players
Los Angeles Angels managers
Los Angeles Angels of Anaheim managers
Los Angeles Dodgers coaches
Los Angeles Dodgers players
Major League Baseball bench coaches
Major League Baseball catchers
Minor league baseball managers
Manager of the Year Award winners
National League All-Stars
Olympic baseball managers
Penn State Nittany Lions baseball players
Pennsylvania State University alumni
People from Westlake Village, California
San Antonio Dodgers players
Sportspeople from Ventura County, California
World Series-winning managers